Tezcatlan Miyahuatzin (fl. 14th century) was the second Queen of Tenochtitlan.

Tezcatlan Miyahuatzin was a daughter of Acacitli. She married Acamapichtli, the first king of Tenochtitlan. She was a mother of his successor Huitzilihuitl and grandmother of kings Chimalpopoca and Moctezuma I and princes Tlacaelel and Huehue Zaca. Her son had many more children, so she had many more grandchildren. She lived in a harmony with Ilancueitl, Acamapichtli's first wife.

See also
List of Tenochtitlan rulers

Further reading 

Tenochca nobility
14th-century women
14th-century indigenous people of the Americas
Queens of Tenochtitlan
Nobility of the Americas